Park Jin-seong (born 15 May 2001) is a South Korean footballer currently playing as a left-back for Jeonbuk Hyundai Motors.

Career statistics

Club

Notes

References

2001 births
Living people
Yonsei University alumni
South Korean footballers
South Korea youth international footballers
Association football defenders
K League 1 players
Jeonbuk Hyundai Motors players